The Human Factor is an American medical drama television series that aired on CBS from April 16 to May 28, 1992 and starred Eriq La Salle and John Mahoney. The executive producer was Dick Wolf.

Cast
John Mahoney as Dr. Alec McMurtry
Jan Lucas as Joan McMurtry
Eriq La Salle as Michael Stoven
Melinda McGraw as Rebecca Travis
Kurt Deutsch as Matt Robbins
Matthew Ryan as Joe Murphy

Episodes

External links

1990s American drama television series
1992 American television series debuts
1992 American television series endings
English-language television shows
1990s American medical television series
CBS original programming
Television series by Universal Television
Television series by Wolf Films
 Television shows set in Chicago